Lobonema is a monotypic genus of cnidarians belonging to the family Lobonematidae. The only species is Lobonema smithii.

The species is found in Malesia.

References

Lobonematidae
Scyphozoan genera
Monotypic cnidarian genera